Pierre Fakhoury (born 1943 in Dabou, Côte d'Ivoire) is a Lebanese/Ivorian architect. He graduated at the School of Architecture at Tournai, Belgium.

His notable work includes the Basilica of Our Lady of Peace in Yamoussoukro, Côte d'Ivoire. Since 1983, Fakhoury has been involved in the relocation of the capital of Côte d'Ivoire from Abidjan to Yamoussoukro.

His daughter, Cécile Fakhoury, is a gallery owner who opened three locations for her eponymous gallery in Abidjan, Dakar, and Paris.

External links
Pierre Fakhoury in Jeune Afrique

References 

Ivorian architects
Ivorian people of Lebanese descent
Ivorian sculptors
Living people
Lebanese architects
Lebanese sculptors
1943 births